Wood v. Lucy, Lady Duff-Gordon, 222 N.Y. 88, 118 N.E. 214 (1917), is a New York state contract case in which the New York Court of Appeals held Lucy, Lady Duff-Gordon, to a contract that assigned the sole right to market her name to her advertising agent.

Facts
 The plaintiff, Otis F. Wood,  was a top  New York  advertising agent whose clients included major commercial clients as well as celebrities. The defendant, Lucy, Lady Duff-Gordon, otherwise known as "Lucile" (her couture label), was a leading designer of fashions for high society as well as the stage and early silent cinema, and was a survivor of the 1912 sinking of the RMS Titanic. Lady Duff-Gordon signed a contract with Wood giving him the exclusive right to market garments and other products bearing her endorsement for one year beginning on April 1, 1915. This contract gave Lucy Duff Gordon half of all revenues thus derived. Wood's only duties under the contract were to account for monies received and secure patents as necessary - but if Wood did not work to market the clothes, no monies would be received and no patents would become necessary. Around the same time,  Duff-Gordon came up with an idea to market a line of clothing  "for the masses" and broke the purported agreement by endorsing products sold by Sears Roebuck. Wood sued, with Lucy defending on the grounds that no valid contract existed. Lucy argued that since Wood had not made an express promise to do anything, the agreement was invalid and could not be enforced for lack of consideration. The  trial court disagreed with her argument and found for Wood but was reversed by the Appellate Division, an intermediate appellate court. Wood then appealed to the Court of Appeals of New York, the highest court in the state, which then considered whether an agreement with a promise not expressly stated might still require performance of that promise given the context of the agreement.

Judgment
The Court, in an opinion by  Judge  Benjamin N. Cardozo, made new law by determining that a promise to exclusively represent the interests of a party constituted sufficient consideration to require enforcement of an unstated duty to use reasonable efforts based on that promise. Cardozo wrote of the arrangement that  "[a] promise may be lacking, and yet the whole writing may be 'instinct with an obligation,'  imperfectly expressed."   "The acceptance of the exclusive agency,"  he found,  "was an assumption of its duties." He stated, "the law has outgrown its primitive stage of formalism when the precise word was the sovereign talisman...it takes a broader view today." Based on this reasoning, the Appellate Division was reversed, and the decision of the trial court was reinstated. The case, with a relatively short and concisely written opinion, has become a staple of American and Canadian law school contracts  casebooks, along with several other opinions written by Judge Cardozo.

See also
US contract law
English contract law
Brand ambassador

External links
Wood v. Duff-Gordon 222 N.Y. 88, 118 N.E. 214 (New York 1917); full text of the opinion, with reporter's summary, and the arguments and cases presented by the attorneys for each party.
ContractsProf Blog: Today in History: Wood v. Lucy, Lady Duff Gordon
Some interesting facts of the case from Kent Law professor, Richard Warner
Case Brief for Wood v. Lucy, Lady Duff-Gordon at Lawnix.com

New York (state) state case law
United States contract case law
1917 in United States case law
1917 in New York (state)